Meuschenia is a genus of filefishes native to the coastal waters around Australia. There are eight species from the temperate southern half of Australia.

Species
There are currently 8 recognized species in this genus:
 Meuschenia australis (Donovan, 1824) (Southern leatherjacket)
 Meuschenia flavolineata Hutchins, 1977 (Yellow-striped leatherjacket)
 Meuschenia freycineti (Quoy & Gaimard, 1824) (Six-spined leatherjacket)
 Meuschenia galii Hutchins, 1977 (Blue-lined leatherjacket)
 Meuschenia hippocrepis (Quoy & Gaimard, 1824) (Horse-shoe leatherjacket)
 Meuschenia scaber (J. R. Forster, 1801) (Velvet leatherjacket)
 Meuschenia trachylepis (Günther, 1870)
 Meuschenia venusta Hutchins, 1977 (Stars and stripes leatherjacket)

References

Monacanthidae
Marine fish genera
Taxa named by Gilbert Percy Whitley